The Britannia Catchments Group is a Quaternary lithostratigraphic group (a sequence of rock strata or other definable geological units) present in all parts of Great Britain and including the Isle of Man. It includes a wide range of deposits including alluvium, river terrace deposits, peat, head, cover sand and blown sand of fluvial, lacustrine, mass movement, periglacial and aeolian origin. Its lower boundary is defined as an unconformable contact with the underlying Albion Glacigenic Group (in England and Wales), the Caledonia Glacigenic Group (in Scotland), the Dunwich Group, Crag Group or with older bedrock. Its upper boundary is generally the present day ground surface but it interfingers locally with the British Coastal Deposits Group.

The group is subdivided into more geographically restricted subgroups by river catchments of which the following are defined:

 Northern Highlands and Argyll Catchments Subgroup
 Grampian Catchments Subgroup
 Tay Catchments Subgroup
 Forth Catchments Subgroup
 Clyde Catchments Subgroup
 Tweed Catchments Subgroup
 Solway Catchments Subgroup
 Northumbria Catchments Subgroup
 Isle of Man Catchments Subgroup
 Cheshire-North Wales Catchments Subgroup
 Yorkshire Catchments Subgroup
 Trent Catchments Subgroup
 Severn and Avon Catchments Subgroup
 West Wales Catchments Subgroup
 Ouse-Nene Catchments Subgroup
 Yare Catchments Subgroup
 Somerset Catchments Subgroup
 Thames Catchments Subgroup
 Suffolk Catchments Subgroup
 Cornubian Catchments Subgroup
 Solent Catchments Subgroup
 Sussex Catchments Subgroup
 South Kent Catchments Subgroup

Subgroups may also be defined for the various Scottish island groups.

References

Quaternary geologic formations
Geology of England
Geology of Scotland
Geology of Wales
Geological groups of the United Kingdom